OPIN was established in September 2002 by Interros in order to consolidate its real estate assets and operations. It was the first Russian real estate developer to list its shares in Russia. Based in Moscow, the Group is focused on the development of the residential housing and the investment grade Class A office space. Its listed in RTS, the main Russian stock exchange.

Since its inception, OPIN has developed almost 200,000 sq. m of commercial space and 500 ha of developed master-planned communities.

See also
Mikhail Prokhorov

References

External links 
 Official Russian and English site

Companies listed on the Moscow Exchange
Companies based in Moscow
Real estate companies of Russia